Vidya may refer to:

 Vidya (philosophy), a concept in Hindu and Buddhist philosophy
 Vidya (journal), a bimonthly journal published by the Triple Nine Society
 Vidya (film), a 1948 Bollywood film
 Vidya Academy of Science and Technology, Thrissur, an engineering college in Kerala locally also known as Vidya
 A slang term for video games

People

Vijja, 8th or 9th century Sanskrit poet, alternatively known as Vidya